Florent "Flor" Jan Maria Lambrechts (25 March 1910 – 14 April 1990) was a Belgian footballer who played as a forward and midfielder. He played in the First Division for several seasons with Antwerp FC and RCS La Forestoise.

With Antwerp, Lambrechts won the 1929 and 1931 Belgian First Divisions. He also achieved second place with the team in the 1929–30, 1931–32 and 1932–33 seasons. He was the Belgian top scorer of the 1935–36 season, in which he also achieved the record of scoring 7 goals in a single First Division game. 

After troubles inside the club, he had to move out of Antwerp to RCS La Forestoise in 1937. In 1941, the club achieved promotion to the Belgian First Division by winning the 

In total he played 208 games in the Belgian First Division, scoring 150 goals.

Biography
Lambrechts made his debut in 1927 in the Antwerp first team in a friendly match, little more than a month after celebrating his 18th birthday. By the 1929/30 season he had secured a place as a starter. Lambrechts became national champion with Antwerp in 1929 and 1931 and reached second place in 1930, 1932 and 1933. 

In the 1935–36 season, Lambrechts was the top scorer of the First Division with 37 goals. In that season, he also scored a record 7 goals in one game in a home match against Berchem Sport.

After a conflict with the dismissed trainer Molnar, Antwerp suspended a number of fundamental players in 1937, including Lambrechts. That year he had to move to the then second division team RCS La Forestoise. Eventually, he continued to play there until 1946. The club was able to achieve promotion to the First Division in 1941. After the championship, which had been interrupted due to the Second World War, was resumed in 1945, he played there one more season. In total he played 208 games in First Division and scored 150 goals.

Career statistics

Club

Honours

Club 
Antwerp
Belgian First Division: 1928–29, 1930–31

La Forestoise 
Belgian Second Division: 1941–42

Individual 
 Belgian First Division top scorer: 1935–36 (37 goals)

References

1910 births
1990 deaths
Footballers from Antwerp
Belgian footballers
Royal Antwerp F.C. players
Belgian Pro League players
Association football midfielders
Association football forwards